The Pop Ups (Jason Rabinowitz and Jacob Stein) are a GRAMMY nominated children's musical duo based in Brooklyn, New York. Making their national TV debut on Sprout's "Sunny Side Up Show" in April 2014, the duo released their third album “Appetite For Construction” in August 2014. The Pop Ups perform regularly around New York City venues using cardboard props, hand-painted sets and a cast of original puppets. They also have toured nationally, including a tour with Yo Gabba Gabba! Live.

Overview 
Joining forces in 2009, creators Jason Rabinowitz and Jacob Stein have a combined background in music and art. Jason Rabinowitz, a performer and musician, has appeared in Broadway shows “One Man, Two Guvnors” and “Encores! City Center”. Jacob Stein, having studied Art at Yale and Columbia has taught music and education at the University level. The duo created a puppet musical for their two previous albums, weaving unique “electro-acoustic pop” songs into a live stage show. The Pop Ups won praise from critics for their first stage show “PASTA: A Pop Ups Puppet Musical,” which enjoyed successful runs in New York and Los Angeles. The Pop Ups’ music is recorded from Jason's home in South Brooklyn, which is also where their stage shows, videos and merchandise are all assembled.

“Radio Jungle” (2012) features such notable collaborators as Shawana Kemp (Shine & the Moonbeams), legendary psych-rock pioneer Peter Stampfel (The Fugs and Holy Modal Rounders), and Oran Etkin, a clarinetist-educator who has participated in other productions recognized by the Recording Academy (GRAMMYs). In 2012 they also released "40 Things To Do In A Blackout" a post Hurricane Sandy relief single. “Appetite For Construction” (2014) premiered to wide critical acclaim from outlets such as Huffington Post, Cool Mom Picks and parents.com. SiriusXM program director Mindy Thomas described the sound as "sophisticated pop beats, juxtaposed with kid-centric lyrics, in a way that's simultaneously masterful and comical,” and named the record “an all-ages album that is defining the family music scene today."

Critical reception 

Released in 2012, “Radio Jungle” garnered a GRAMMY nomination and accolades from Parents’ Choice, the Fids and Kamily Awards (a national critics’ poll) and PopDose. The first single from their most recent album “Appetite For Construction” hit number 1 on SiriusXM's Kids Place Live. The Pop Ups have won two Parents Choice Awards, two National Parenting Publication Awards, and won the #1 Song of the Year on Kid's Corner. The duo have also been featured in Wall Street Journal and New York Times, as well as top 10 lists by Time Out New York, The Washington Post, Fids and Kamily, Zooglobble and Red Tricycle.

"Appetite For Construction" was featured in September 2014 on NPR's All Things Considered by children's music reviewer Stefan Shepherd, who noted that "if MTV had a kids music channel in their video heyday, this song, "All These Shapes" would have been in constant rotation".

In December 2014, the album was nominated for a Grammy Award in the Best Children's Album category

Discography 
 Outside Voices – 2010
 Radio Jungle – 2012
 Appetite For Construction – 2014
 Great Pretenders Club – 2015
 Giants of Science – 2018

References 

Musical groups from Brooklyn
American children's musical groups
American musical duos